USS Effective may refer to:

, was launched 13 June 1942, reclassified PC-1596, 1 June 1944 and decommissioned 9 November 1945.
, was launched 26 September 1991 and is currently in service.

United States Navy ship names